The 1997 Speedway Grand Prix of Great Britain was the fourth race of the 1997 Speedway Grand Prix season. It was taken place on 9 August in the Odsal Stadium in Bradford, Great Britain It was the third British SGP but the first and only in Bradford. The race was won by Danish rider Brian Andersen. It was the first and only win in his career.

Starting positions draw 

The Speedway Grand Prix Commission nominated Joe Screen from Great Britain as Wild Card.

Heat details

The intermediate classification

See also 
 Speedway Grand Prix
 List of Speedway Grand Prix riders

References

External links 
 FIM-live.com
 SpeedwayWorld.tv

Speedway Grand Prix of Great Britain
Gr
1997
Speedway Grand Prix of Great Britain
Speedway Grand Prix of Great Britain